"Some Things Never Change" is a song co-written and recorded by American country music singer Sara Evans.  It was released in February 2008 as the second single from her Greatest Hits compilation album.  The song reached number 26 on the US Billboard Hot Country Songs chart.  Evans wrote this song with her brother Matt Evans, Hillary Lindsey, and John Shanks.

Content
This song is a celebration of home, family, and such simple pleasures as seeing the kids get off the bus at the end of the school day. The song's title, "some things never change", is based on how the central character realizes that, while things may change in the world around her, the basics of love between family will never change.

Chart performance

References

2008 singles
2007 songs
Sara Evans songs
Songs written by Sara Evans
Songs written by Hillary Lindsey
Songs written by John Shanks
RCA Records singles